Sturla Fagerhaug  (born 6 November 1991)   is a former Grand Prix motorcycle racer from Norway. He retired from racing after 2011 when he was 20. Fagerhaug is now considered one of Norway's best surfers, competing in the Lofoten Masters and the European Championship in 2017.

Career statistics

Red Bull MotoGP Rookies Cup

Races by year
(key) (Races in bold indicate pole position, races in italics indicate fastest lap)

Grand Prix motorcycle racing

By season

Races by year

References

External links
 Profile on motogp.com

Living people
1991 births
Norwegian motorcycle racers
125cc World Championship riders
Norwegian surfers